Rye Park is a town in the Southern Tablelands region of New South Wales, Australia.

Rye Park is situated on the Pudman Creek, which is a pristine waterway inhabited by platypus, turtles, frogs and the endangered Pigmy Perch.

The area was first settled by Europeans in the 1840s to farm the land. There have been periods of mining for silver and tin but today the town is involved in production of wool and meat.

Evidence of the village's early settlers can still be found. Hamilton Hume’s family settled in the area in 1865. Their homestead remains relatively unchanged from its original construction and it is still a privately owned working sheep property.

Rye Park has had a school since 1876.

References

Towns in New South Wales
Southern Tablelands
Hilltops Council

1840s establishments in Australia